Mott is both an English surname and given name. Notable people with the name include:

Surname

B
Basil Mott (1859–1938), British civil engineer
Bitsy Mott (1918–2001), American baseball player

C
Charles James Mott (1880–1918), British baritone
Charles Stewart Mott (1875–1973), American businessman
Christopher Mott, American academic

D
Dan Mott (fl. 2000 – 2007), American actor

E
Edward John Mott (1893–1967), British soldier
Elias Bertram Mott (1897–1961), American politician

F
Frank Luther Mott (1886–1964), American historian
Frederick Walker Mott (1853–1926), British biochemist

G
Gershom Mott (1822–1884), American army officer
Gordon Newell Mott (1812–1887), American Congressman from Nevada

J
James Mott (1788–1868), American Quaker leader, husband of Lucretia
James Mott (New Jersey politician) (1739–1823), American Congressman from New Jersey
James Wheaton Mott (1883–1945), American Congressman from Oregon
Joe Mott (born 1956), American football player
John De Mott (1790–1870), American Congressman from New York
John Raleigh Mott (1865–1955), American YMCA leader
Jordan Lawrence Mott (1799–c. 1870), American industrialist

L
Lawrence Mott (1881–1931), American novelist, grandson of Jordan L. Mott Jr.
Lewis Freeman Mott (1863–1941), American academic
Lucretia Mott (1793–1880), American Quaker leader, wife of James
Luiz Mott (born 1946), Brazilian civil rights activist
Luther W. Mott (1874–1923), American Congressman from New York

M
Marion Mott-McGrath (born 1940), Australian chess player
Matthew Mott (born 1973), Australian cricketer
Michael Mott (born 1943), British-American author  
 Mildred Mott Wedel (1912–1995), American scholar of Great Plains archaeology and ethnohistory
Morris Mott (born 1946), Canadian ice hockey player

N
Nevill Francis Mott (1905–1996), British physicist

P
Peter De Mott (1947–2009), American peace activist

R
Richard Mott (politician) (1804–1888), American Congressman from Ohio
Ricky Mott (born 1981), Australian AFL footballer
Rodney Mott (fl. 1998 – 2007), American basketball referee
Ruth Mott (1917–2012), British television cook

S
Stephen Charles Mott (born 1940), American academic
Steve Mott (born 1961), American footballer
Stewart Rawlings Mott (1937–2008), American philanthropist

V
Valentine Mott (1785–1865), American surgeon

W
William Albert Mott (1864–1911), Canadian politician from New Brunswick
William I. Mott (born 1953), American horse trainer
William Malcolm Mott (1894–1961), Canadian politician from British Columbia
William Penn Mott Jr. (1909–1992), American landscape architect

Given name or nickname

Mott T. Greene, American historian of science and professor
Mott B. Schmidt (1889–1977), American architect
Morrison Waite (1816-1888), nicknamed "Mott", American attorney, politician and seventh Chief Justice of the United States

Fictional characters
Ernie Mott, protagonist of the 1944 film None but the Lonely Heart, played by Cary Grant
Wilfred Mott, a recurring Doctor Who character
Dandy Mott, antagonist of the television series American Horror Story: Freak Show, portrayed by Finn Wittrock

See also
Mote (disambiguation)
Motte (disambiguation)

English-language surnames
Surnames from given names